William Light (1786–1839) was the first Surveyor-General of the Colony of South Australia.

William Light may also refer to:

Bill Light (William C. Light, born 1949), American farmer and politician
Billy Light (William Henry Light, 1913–1993), English footballer
William Light (cricketer) (1878–1930), English cricketer
William Light (Kansas politician) (fl. from 1999)
William Sidney "Cap" Light (c. 1863 - 1893), Texas lawman

See also
Light (surname)